Roller Coaster Corporation of America (RCCA) was an amusement ride manufacturer based in the United States. The company's first major project was the Rattler at Six Flags Fiesta Texas in 1992, while their most famous coaster was the Son of Beast at Kings Island, the world's tallest and second looping wooden coaster when it opened in 2000.

History
The Roller Coaster Corporation of America was established in 1967, but the president Michael Black had worked on wooden coaster construction projects before, like the Great American Scream Machine at Six Flags Over Georgia in 1973, with his father Marvin Black and brother Stephen Black. The company prided itself in their manufacturing technique, which involved pre-manufacturing sections of the wooden structure and track at facilities off-site and then assembling on-site. This reduced what could otherwise be a year long construction project to around 6 months. In 1992, under the name Roller Coaster Corporation of Texas, they built the Rattler for Six Flags Fiesta Texas, which opened as the tallest, fastest, and steepest wooden coaster in the world. However, the RCCA faced criticism for rushing through testing, and the ride's high forces led to numerous injuries during the first year of operation.

In 1997, the RCCA was approached by Paramount Kings Island to create the world's first wooden hyper coaster. The result of 3 years of planning and construction was Son of Beast, which opened in May 2000. While reviews were initially positive, the ride deteriorated over the first year, leading to a lawsuit from Kings Island against the RCCA and some of their contractors for shoddy design and insufficient supports. In response, the RCCA claimed that Kings Island had dismissed the company before construction was completed to save money and filed their own suit.

The RCCA built a handful of other coasters in the early 2000s, the most recent being Coaster Express at Parque Warner Madrid in 2002. The company did not continue to build any more roller coasters, and folded in 2005.

List of roller coasters

Roller Coaster Corporation of America built 7 roller coasters around the world. Two are now defunct (Son of Beast and White Canyon) and one has been completely re-done by Rocky Mountain Construction (Rattler).

References

Roller coaster manufacturers
Manufacturing companies established in 1979
Manufacturing companies based in Atlanta
1979 establishments in Georgia (U.S. state)